Police Police is a 2010 Indian Telugu-language buddy cop film directed by Manmohan Challa and produced by Chandu, Mohan Rao Kalyan Patil and Bhaskar Kandagatla. The film stars Sriram, Prithviraj Sukumaran (in his Telugu debut), Kamalinee Mukherjee and Sanjjanaa in the lead roles. The film was released after a two year delay due to problems with releasing the Tamil version, which was later dropped. The film has been dubbed in Tamil as Kutrappirivu in May 2010. The story revolves around two police officers with different ideologies. The film was released on 9 April 2010.

Plot
ASP Ranadheer (Sriram) appears as the protagonist while DSP Ravikanth (Prithviraj Sukumaran) appears as the antagonist. Ranadheer is a sincere cop who tries to remove wrongdoers, whereas Ravikanth is a corrupt police officer who has tie-ups with antisocial people. Ranadheer finds Ravikanth to be the culprit but is unable to prove that. In the event, he also loses his wife Harika (Kamalinee Mukherjee). How he manages to prove Ravikanth as the culprit forms the rest of the story.

Cast

Sriram as ASP Ranadheer IPS
Prithviraj Sukumaran as DSP Ravikanth
Kamalinee Mukherjee as Harika
Sanjjanaa Galrani as Sandhya
Ahuti Prasad as Tajuddin
Dhandapani as Janardhan
Brahmaji as Sivaji
Madhusudhan Rao as Gangadhar
C. V. L. Narasimha Rao as Swamy
Vasu Inturi as Venkatachalam
Sritej as Chanakya
Pruthvi as DSP David
Venu as Venu
Amit Tiwari

Production 
Sriram wanted to work in Telugu films and contacted Manmohan Challa, who used to dub his Tamil films in Telugu. Prithviraj, who starred with Sriram in Kana Kandaen, was cast, marking his first Telugu film. Prithviraj put on weight for his role in the film. Manisha Lamba was originally chosen to play the heroine and Chakri was originally chosen to compose the music. The film began production in 2008 as a bilingual in Telugu and Tamil with the Tamil version titled Idam Valam. Sun Pictures was announced as the film's producer. The Tamil version was later dropped.

Soundtrack

References

External links

2010 films
2010s buddy comedy films
Indian action comedy films
2010s Telugu-language films
2010 action comedy films
Fictional portrayals of the Andhra Pradesh Police
Indian buddy comedy films
2010s buddy cop films
Films scored by Sai Karthik